My Woman or my woman may refer to:

 One's girlfriend or wife (German: Meine Frau)

Music and film 
 My Woman (album), a 2016 album by American singer-songwriter Angel Olsen
 My Woman (film), a 1933 American drama romance film
 "My Woman", a 1932 song by Lew Stone
 "My Woman, My Woman, My Wife", a 1970 song by American country singer Marty Robbins
 My Woman, My Woman, My Wife (album), a 1970 album by Dean Martin